Zdeněk Kolář and Lukáš Rosol were the defending champions but only Kolář chose to defend his title, partnering Roman Jebavý. Kolář lost in the final to Aleksandr Nedovyesov and Gonçalo Oliveira.

Nedovyesov and Oliveira won the title after defeating Jebavý and Kolář 1–6, 7–6(7–5), [10–6] in the final.

Seeds

Draw

References

External links
 Main draw

Moneta Czech Open - Doubles
2021 Doubles